"Shorty (You Keep Playin' with My Mind)" is the debut single from R&B group Imajin and features a rap from Keith Murray. It peaked at number 25 on the Billboard Hot 100 and number 20 on the Hot R&B/Hip-Hop Songs chart in 1998. The song contains a sample of "Dance With Me" by Peter Brown.

Charts

References

1998 singles
American contemporary R&B songs